This is a list of cricket grounds in Namibia.  The grounds included in this list have held first-class, List-A and Twenty20 matches.

References

External links
Cricket grounds in Namibia at CricketArchive.

  
Cricket grounds
Cricket grounds
Namibia